Golden Words is a weekly humour publication produced by students at Queen's University at Kingston in Kingston, Ontario, Canada. It claims to be the only humour weekly in Canada.

The paper was founded by the Engineering Society in 1967 to give the Engineering Society a voice on campus.  Its very first cartoon contained an Engineer reading a copy of the Queen's Journal, thinking to himself "Oh, what crap is this?".  It has been published more or less continuously since inception, appearing every Wednesday for most of the Fall and Winter terms, unless the editors have tricked the readers into believing it had been shut down (as was the case in November 1985).  Recent volumes have run 25 issues.

Along with the Queen's Journal, it is one of the two main student-run publications on campus, and claims a circulation of roughly 4,000 copies.

The paper's humour style reflects its motto: "Sola Veritas Est Qui Facit Ut Me in Merda", which translates to "Only The Truth Gets Me In Shit".  Its printed humour is diverse, running the gamut from absurdist sketches and short stories to political satire and commentary on current events.  Practical jokes have also figured prominently in its history, and are typically revealed in subsequent issues.  Published parodies have included Queen's Journal (often appearing more than 24 hours early to coincide with the Journal's publication day), the Queen's Gazette (for faculty and staff), the Kingston Whig-Standard, and a national newspaper, The Globe and Mail.  (When parodied in the 1980s, The Globe and Mail itself reported that the engineers had actually inserted the ersatz versions into the coin boxes in the Globe's own lobby.)  In September 1989, the masthead staff stole the Greasepole (an engineering icon) from the first year students charged with protecting it - and ransomed it back to them for 100 cases of beer. The paper maintains a friendly rivalry with the Journal.

Although Golden Words is owned by the Engineering Society, the paper attracts contributors (writers, artists, and editorial staff) from across the undergraduate population. Notable Golden Words alumni include humourist Jay Pinkerton, game designer Erin Robinson, screenwriter Elan Mastai, and 1000 Awesome Things author Neil Pasricha. Robertson Davies serially published the first few chapters of his work The Manticore in the Golden Words, with the mythical title character originally a Mexican hairless cat who could read German.

The paper’s editors for the 54th Volume are Seth Davis and Oren Katz. The paper's editors for the 55th Volume are Spencer Tingle and Zoë Rolfe-Low.
The paper's editors for the 56th Volume are Haneen Saleem and Jacob Bellini. The paper's editors for the 57th Volume are Bavneet Kandola and Ryan Soth.

See also
List of student newspapers in Canada
List of newspapers in Canada
Harvard Lampoon

References

External links

1967 establishments in Ontario
Queen's University at Kingston
Student magazines published in Canada
Satirical magazines published in Canada
College humor magazines
Mass media in Kingston, Ontario
Humour magazines published in Canada
Magazines established in 1967
Magazines published in Ontario